Conor Dunne (born 22 January 1992) is an Irish former professional cyclist, who competed professionally between 2014 and 2019 for the , ,  and  teams.

Career

Professional racing
Born in St Albans, Dunne was named in the startlist for the 2017 Vuelta a España.

Following the collapse of the  team, in November 2018 it emerged that Dunne would join the  team for the 2019 season, with his salary being paid for by former Aqua Blue owner Rick Delaney due to Dunne signing a contract with the team for 2019 before it folded. In May 2019, he was named in the startlist for the 2019 Giro d'Italia.

On 30 December 2019, he announced on social media that he was retiring from professional cycling.

Global Cycling Network (GCN)
On 7 January 2020, Global Cycling Network (GCN) announced him as a new presenter.

On 2 May 2020 GCN's YouTube channel released a video where Dunne turned his garden into a Velodrome to create a Garden Hour Cycling Distance record with help from his brother-in-law Nigel.

Personal life
His sister is tennis player Katy Dunne.

Major results
Source: 

2009
 2nd Time trial, British National Junior Road Championships
2010
 1st  Time trial, British National Junior Road Championships
2012
 1st  Time trial, Irish National Under-23 Road Championships
2013
 1st Stage 1 An Post Rás
 Irish National Under-23 Road Championships
2nd Time trial
3rd Road race
2014
 3rd Road race, Irish National Under-23 Road Championships
2015
 3rd Road race, Irish National Road Championships
 9th Dwars door de Vlaamse Ardennen
2016
 1st Rutland–Melton CiCLE Classic
2017
 3rd Road race, Irish National Road Championships
2018
 1st  Road race, Irish National Road Championships
2019
 5th Overall Tour of Antalya
 9th Fyen Rundt

Grand Tour general classification results timeline

References

External links

1992 births
Living people
Irish male cyclists
Sportspeople from St Albans
European Games competitors for Ireland
Cyclists at the 2015 European Games